Yamilka Noa (born 31 July 1980) is a Cuban-Costa Rican poet and filmmaker, awarded five times by "Nosside World Poetry Prize" (Italy). Her works have been translated into three languages.

Her poems have been published in several literary journals and magazines including AN, Isla Negra, Poetas del mundo, Guatini, Cinosargo, Arcane Radio, and Radio Momentos, "El País".

Life
Her career as a poet began In 2006 when she self-published her book "La pasión detrás de la ventana", three years after she moved to Costa Rica. She became Costa Rican citizen in 2011 while living in London United Kingdom, where she studied from 2009 until 2013. She graduated from University of West London majoring in Film Production.

She is, simultaneously, member of multiple literary groups including Global Writers in Spanish/REMES network; Poetas del mundo; La Voz de la Palabra Escrita International; Mi Literatura; Poesía sin genero; Mi Arte; El poder de la palabra; Cerca de ti, Artes Poeticas, Punto Hispano, LetrasKiltras, Creatividad Internacional.

Her father, Pedro M. Calzadilla Guevara, who was also a poet, died in 2008. In 2009 she introduced her book "Mi miedo sólo mío", in the Barbican Centre and paid tribute to her father.

Prizes
Five special mentions (Including a medal) in the Nosside Poetry Prize competition (2007, 2008, 2009, 2010, 2011 for her video poem 'Insomnio'), an International Multilingual and Multimedia Award for previously unpublished work. Best Performance by a performer working in English and another language by Farrago Zoo Awards, 2010.

Anthologies
Unesco World Poetry Directory (Nosside prize) in Spanish.
World Erotic Poetry Anthology (1st edition) "Blessed be your body" in Spanish "Bendito sea tu cuerpo" "The Agony of Nirvana"  In Spanish "La Agonía del Nirvana" “Sotto l’arbole di Natale "1001 Poems" in Spanish.

Bibliography
La pasión detrás de la ventana] (2007)
 Travesuras del alma (2008)
 Mi miedo sólo mío 2008, Dexeo Editores in Spanish, 2009 Libertà Edizione, 
 Ecos de tristeza (2010) translated by Laura P. Burns

References

External links
Author's blog
Author's Twitter

1980 births
Living people
Alumni of the University of West London
21st-century Costa Rican poets
Cuban emigrants to Costa Rica
Writers from London
Costa Rican women poets
21st-century Costa Rican women writers